Bendo Bridge is a wooden covered bridge over Willowemoc Creek in the town of Rockland, in Sullivan County, New York. This single 48 foot span Town lattice truss bridge was built by John Davidson in 1860 in Livingston Manor and then moved to its current location in 1913.

See also
 List of covered bridges in New York
 Van Tran Flat Bridge

References

External links
 Bendo Bridge, at New York State Covered Bridge Society
 Bendo Bridge, at Covered Bridges of the Northeast USA

Covered bridges in New York (state)
Bridges completed in 1860
Wooden bridges in New York (state)
Bridges in Sullivan County, New York
Tourist attractions in Sullivan County, New York
Road bridges in New York (state)